The Bayandurids or the Tur-'Alids ruled over the Aq Qoyunlu confederation, that was founded by Tur Ali bin Pehlwan (1340-1360 C.E.), and was followed by his son Qutlugh bin Tur Ali (1360-1378/79 C.E.) and his grandson Uthman Beg respectively, the founder of Aq Qoyunlu state. The dynasty originated around Diyarbakır and ruled the territory now part of present-day Turkey, Iraq and Iran. Their capital was the city of Tabriz after 1471-1472. They gained international significance under Uzun Hasan who became their greatest leader. He conquered the Qara Qoyunlu and defeated the Timurid Empire, thus adding significant portions of Iran to his kingdom. He eventually lost to the Ottoman Empire, weakening his kingdom. The kingdom was eventually absorbed into Safavid Iran.

Aq Qoyunlu rulers
In letters from the Ottoman Sultans, when addressing the kings of Aq Qoyunlu, such titles as  "Iranian King of Kings",  "Iranian Sultan of Sultans",  Shåhanshåh Irån Khadiv Ajam "Shahanshah of Iran and Ruler of Persia", Jamshid shawkat va Fereydun råyat va Dårå deråyat "Powerful like Jamshid, flag of Fereydun and wise like Darius" have been used. Uzun Hassan also held the title Padishah-i Iran "Padishah of Iran", which was re-adopted again in the Safavid times through his grandson Ismail I, the founder of the Safavid dynasty.

Yellow Shaded rows signify Progenitors of Aq Qoyunlu dynasty.
Blue Shaded row signifies Nominal rule.

References

Aq Qoyunlu rulers
Aq Qoyunlu